Mount Willing is located in Lowndes County, Alabama, United States. It is a small crossroads community and birthplace of Navy Admiral Thomas Hinman Moorer, who served as the Chief of Naval Operations from 1967 to 1970, and the Chairman of the Joint Chiefs of Staff from 1970 to 1974.

It was also the birthplace of John Lee (1915–1977), a country blues guitarist, pianist, singer and songwriter.

Demographics

Mount Willing appeared on the 1890 U.S. Census. It was the only time it appeared on the census rolls.

References

Unincorporated communities in Alabama
Unincorporated communities in Lowndes County, Alabama
Montgomery metropolitan area